Darryl Ford (born June 22, 1966) is a former gridiron football linebacker who played in the National Football League (NFL) and the Canadian Football League (CFL). He played college football at New Mexico State.

Early life and high school
Ford was born and grew up in Dallas, Texas and attended Franklin D. Roosevelt High School. During Ford's childhood years, Ford played with The Comets Team in Pop Warner League at the neighborhood Salvation Army Center. Ford did not play organized football until his sophomore year of high school. As a senior, he recorded 50 sacks and four interceptions. Ford was name Mr. Touchdown by Local radio announcer Mr. Dewayne Dancer,during which the listener's would called-in voted for outstanding weekly high school player of the Football Game. Ford was named to The Dallas Morning News All Star Team his Senior Year.

College career
Ford was a member of the New Mexico State Aggies for five seasons. He led the team in tackles with 154 and sacks with six in his sophomore season. Ford was forced to sit out his true senior year due to academic issues. As a redshirt senior, he was named first-team All-Big West Conference after making 164 tackles with seven sacks. Ford finished his collegiate career as New Mexico State's all-time leading tackler with 511.

Professional career
Ford was signed by the Dallas Cowboys as an undrafted free agent in 1989 and was cut at the end of training camp. He was signed by the Toronto Argonauts of the Canadian Football League (CFL) in 1990 and finished the season with 78 tackles. In 1991, Ford was named a CFL All-Star after making 117 tackles with three sacks and three interceptions and was a member of the championship team.

Following the end of the season Ford was signed by the Pittsburgh Steelers on September 22, 1992. He was waived and picked up by the Detroit Lions. Ford was waived by the Lions on December 10, 1993 after playing in 11 games during the season. Ford was signed by the Atlanta Falcons on May 12, 1994 and spent the entire season with the team.

Ford was signed by the Memphis Mad Dogs, formed as part of the CFL's attempted expansion into the United States, in 1995. He spent the 1996 season with the Saskatchewan Roughriders.

References

1966 births
Living people
American football linebackers
New Mexico State Aggies football players
Toronto Argonauts players
Pittsburgh Steelers players
Detroit Lions players
Atlanta Falcons players
Memphis Mad Dogs players
Saskatchewan Roughriders players
Players of American football from Dallas
Players of Canadian football from Dallas
Canadian football linebackers